Emil Bock (born 19 May 1895 in Barmen; died 6 December 1959 in Stuttgart) was a German anthroposophist, author, theologian and one of the founders of The Christian Community.

In 1914 he began a study of languages at the University of Bonn. However, the same year he enlisted as a volunteer in the First World War and was sent to the front in Flanders, where he was wounded. In 1916, he met for the first time the theologian Friedrich Rittelmeyer, and from 1918 he studied Protestant theology in Berlin, and graduated in 1921. The same year was one of the founders of the Christian Community in Switzerland. Bock soon became the leader of the seminar of the Christian Community, and after the death of Friedrich Rittelmeyer, he became the leader of the community in 1938.

In 1941, the Nazi regime banned the Christian Community due to its alleged "Jewish" and "Masonic" influence, and Bock was sent to the concentration camp Welzheim the same year. He was released from the concentration camp in 1942, however, but was under surveillance for the rest of the war. After the war, Bock was instrumental in the rebuilding of the community.

Works 
Zur religiösen Erneuerung (mit Friedrich Rittelmeyer), Sonderdruck (aus Die Drei, Jg. 1, Heft 9), 1922
Die Kindheit Jesu. Zwei apokryphe Evangelien, Michael Verlag (Christus aller Erde 14/15), München 1924
Das lichte Jahr. Vom Jahreslauf und den Festen (mit Rudolf Meyer), Verlag der Christengemeinschaft (Christus aller Erde 4), Stuttgart 1924
Gegenwartsrätsel im Offenbarungslicht (mit Rudolf Frieling, Johannes Werner Klein, Eberhard Kurras und Rudolf Meyer), Verlag der Christengemeinschaft (Christus aller Erde 16), Stuttgart 1925
Ein Spiel von Johannes dem Täufer. Gemeinde-Spiel zur Sommersonnenwende, Stuttgart 1927
Beiträge zum Verständnis des Evangeliums, Typoskripte, Stuttgart 1927–29 (neu bearbeitet in zwei Bänden 1950)
Neuausgabe als: Das Evangelium. Gesammelte Betrachtungen zum Neuen Testament, Stuttgart 1984 (2. A. 1995), 
Boten des Geistes. Schwäbische Geistesgeschichte und christliche Zukunft, Stuttgart 1929 (4. A. 1987)
Die Katakomben. Bilder von den Mysterien des Urchristentums (mit Robert Goebel), Stuttgart 1930 (2., neu bearbeitete Auflage 1960)
Wiederholte Erdenleben. Die Wiederverkörperungsidee in der deutschen Geistesgeschichte, Stuttgart 1932 (7. A. 1996), 
Beiträge zur Übersetzung des Neuen Testaments, Typoskripte, Stuttgart 1930–33 (neu bearbeitet in zwei Bänden 1950)
Neuausgabe als: Das Neue Testament, Stuttgart 1980; aktuell: Stuttgart 1998, 
Beiträge zur Geistesgeschichte der Menschheit, 7 Bände, Stuttgart 1934ff
1 Urgeschichte, 1934 (9. A. 2005), 
2 Moses und sein Zeitalter, 1935 (8. A. 1996), 
3 Könige und Propheten, 1936 (6. A. 1997), 
4 Cäsaren und Apostel, 1937 (7. A. 1999), 
5 Kindheit und Jugend Jesu, 1939 (9. A. 1994), 
6 Die drei Jahre, 1948 (8. A. 1992), 
7 Paulus, 1954 (5. A. 1997), 
Katholizismus, Protestantismus, Christengemeinschaft. Alte und neue Geistigkeit. Ein Vortrag, Stuttgart 1940
Im michaelischen Zeitalter, Stuttgart 1948
Neuausgabe als: Michaelisches Zeitalter. Die Menschheit vor dem Zeitgewissen, Stuttgart 1979 (2. A. 1995), 
Reisetagebücher. Italien – Griechenland – Heiliges Land, Stuttgart 1949 (3. üb. A. 1986), 
Apokalypse. Betrachtungen über die Offenbarung des Johannes, Stuttgart 1951 (5. A. 1997), 
Die neue Reformation. Vier Vorträge, Stuttgart 1953
Romanische Baukunst und Plastik in Württemberg, Stuttgart 1958
Neu herausgegeben und erweitert als: Schwäbische Romanik, Stuttgart 1973
Das Zeitalter der romanischen Kunst mit besonderer Berücksichtigung der württembergischen Denkmäler, Stuttgart 1958
Zeitgenossen – Weggenossen – Wegbereiter, Stuttgart 1959
Was will die Christengemeinschaft? Zwei öffentliche Vorträge. Herausgegeben von Gottfried Husemann und Kurt von Wistinghausen, Stuttgart 1961
Rudolf Steiner. Studien zu seinem Lebensgang und Lebenswerk, Stuttgart 1961 (3. erw. A. 1990), 
Der Kreis der Jahresfeste, Stuttgart 1962 (6. A. 1999), 
Briefe, Stuttgart 1968, 
Das dreifache Mariengeheimnis. Drei Vorträge, Stuttgart 1997,

Literature 
Rudolf F. Gädeke: "Emil Bock", in: Die Gründer der Christengemeinschaft, Verlag am Goetheanum (Pioniere der Anthroposophie 10), Dornach 1992, S. 68–85, 
Gundhild Kačer-Bock: Emil Bock. Leben und Werk, Urachhaus, Stuttgart 1993, 
Lothar Gassmann: Das anthroposophische Bibelverständnis. Eine kritische Untersuchung unter besonderer Berücksichtigung der exegetischen Veröffentlichungen von Rudolf Steiner, Friedrich Rittelmeyer, Emil Bock und Rudolf Frieling, Brockhaus, Wuppertal 1993,

External links 

Biographischer Eintrag in der Online-Dokumentation der anthroposophischen Forschungsstelle Kulturimpuls

1895 births
1959 deaths
Writers from Wuppertal
People from the Rhine Province
German Christian theologians
Anthroposophists
German Army personnel of World War I
Welzheim concentration camp survivors
20th-century German theologians
German male non-fiction writers
Clergy from Wuppertal